Alex Suarez may refer to:
Alex Suarez (musician) (born 1981), American musician
Álex Suárez (basketball) (born 1993), Spanish basketball player
Álex Suárez (footballer, born 1993), Spanish footballer
Álex Suárez (footballer, born 2003), Spanish footballer